Coleophora gibberosa is a moth of the family Coleophoridae. It is found on the Canary Islands (Fuerteventura) and in Algeria.

References

gibberosa
Moths described in 2003
Moths of Africa